The martinet is a punitive device traditionally used in France and other parts of Europe. The word also has other usages, described below.

Object

A martinet is a short, scourge-like (multi-tail) type of whip made of a wooden handle of about 25 cm (10 inches) in length and about 10 lashes of equal, relatively short length. The lashes are usually made of leather, but sometimes soap-stiffened cords are used in place of leather. It was a traditional instrument of physical punishment in France and other European countries. In French, it also refers to a similar dusting implement; the type for chastisement was also known as fouet d'enfant, meaning child's whip. The lashes are light, so they are ineffective unless the child is whipped naked. The advantage is they give a stinging pain on bare skin, but will not cause an injury.

Person

In French
The term was used for an external pupil of a collège (i.e., a kind of French high school, especially Catholic). Jean Bodin, quoting the examination of three witches by Paolo Grillandi of Castiglione at the Castello San Paolo, Spoleto, records that the witches referred to the Devil as Master Martinet (Maître Martinet), or the Little Master (Petit maître).

In English
In English, the term martinet usually refers not to the whip but to those who might use it: those who demand strict adherence to set rules and mete out punishment for failing to follow them. This sense of the word is reputedly derived from the name of Jean Martinet, Inspector General of the army of Louis XIV, such that its relationship to the word's earlier sense is merely coincidental.

In an extended sense, a martinet is any person who believes strict adherence to rules and etiquette is paramount. Martinets often use etiquette and other rules as an excuse to trump ethics, to the point that etiquette loses its ethical ground. Time, in 1977, famously referred to the Ugandan dictator Idi Amin as a "strutting martinet".

Other uses
A French homonym, from the bird name Martin and suffix -et, is the swift. In  French, martinet also means a type of hammer, a diminutive of marteau.

References

External links

 Etymology OnLine

Whips